The Shenandoah was a daily passenger train operated by Amtrak between Washington and Cincinnati from 1976 until 1981.

History
The Shenandoah began operating on October 31, 1976. The name came from the Shenandoah, a Washington to Akron train operated by the Baltimore & Ohio Railroad until Amtrak took over the nation's passenger trains in 1971.

Connecting service at Cincinnati to Chicago was provided by the Mountaineer/James Whitcomb Riley until 1977, after which it was provided by the Cardinal.

Amtrak discontinued the Shenandoah on September 30, 1981, citing low ridership. Amtrak considered the Shenandoah one of its "weakest lines"; the Department of Transportation had recommended its discontinuance in 1979. Service on the Washington–Cumberland segment of the Shenandoah was replaced by the new Washington–Pittsburgh–Chicago Capitol Limited. The Cincinnati–Cumberland portion remains without rail service, and CSX subsequently abandoned much of the line.

Equipment
The Shenandoah originally operated with Amfleet coaches and a cafe car; one or two coaches were used west of Martinsburg, with two additional coaches on the more-heavily-used segment between Martinsburg and Washington, D.C. The original GE P30CH locomotives were replaced by new EMD F40PH locomotives in 1977. Consists varied based on demand; many trains were just two to three cars long.

The 1978 switch to overnight service required the train to have sleeping facilities per Interstate Commerce Commission rules. Amtrak added two sleeping compartments each to a pair of Amfleet coaches (dubbed "Ampad"), which began service on May 3, 1978.A Congressional mandate resulted in a conventional 10-6 sleeper (10 roomettes and 6 double bedrooms) being added on October 28, 1979. The sleeper was removed on April 26, 1981.

References

External links

1981 timetable

Former Amtrak routes
Passenger rail transportation in Maryland
Passenger rail transportation in Ohio
Passenger rail transportation in Washington, D.C.
Passenger rail transportation in West Virginia
Railway services introduced in 1976
Railway services discontinued in 1981